Amos Lee (born Ryan Anthony Massaro, June 20, 1977) is an American singer-songwriter whose musical style encompasses folk, rock, and soul. He was born in Philadelphia and graduated from the University of South Carolina with a degree in English. After working as a schoolteacher and bartender he began to pursue a career in music. His manager Bill Eib, an artist manager and new artist development agent, submitted a demo recording to Blue Note Records which resulted in a recording contract and association with singer Norah Jones.

Since that time Lee has recorded five albums on Blue Note Records and has toured as an opening act for Norah Jones, Bob Dylan, Elvis Costello, Paul Simon, Merle Haggard, Van Morrison, John Prine, Dave Matthews Band, Adele, the Zac Brown Band, Jack Johnson, The Avett Brothers, and David Gray. His music has appeared on the soundtracks of numerous TV shows and movies. He has performed as a featured artist on the PBS series Bluegrass Underground, on several late night TV shows, and at a voter registration rally for Barack Obama. In 2011, his album Mission Bell debuted at No. 1 on the Billboard 200 chart.

Early life and education
Lee was born Ryan Anthony Massaro in 1977 and was raised in Kensington, Philadelphia. He moved to Cherry Hill, New Jersey at age 11 and graduated from Cherry Hill High School East. Lee attended the University of South Carolina and graduated with a degree in English and a minor in education. During his college years, he developed an interest in music after being inspired by Great Days: The John Prine Anthology. During this period, he began playing the guitar and bass as part of a band and listening to the music of Donny Hathaway, Joni Mitchell, Luther Vandross, Bill Withers, and Otis Redding.

Career
After returning to Philadelphia, Lee worked as a second grade teacher at the Mary McLeod Bethune School and as a bartender at local music venues. He performed at open mic events in the area and, through his manager Bill Eib's contacts with promoters, was hired as an opening act for Mose Allison and B.B. King.

In 2003, Lee's manager Bill Eib sent a four-song demo CD to several record labels, and the representative at Blue Note Records was "immediately struck by his [Lee's] voice". Afterwards, Norah Jones heard Lee's music while visiting the record company and invited Lee to be the opening act for her 2004 tour.

The friendship between Lee's manager Bill Eib and Bob Dylan's manager Jeff Kramer resulted in Lee touring with Dylan as his opening act in early 2005. Later, Lee began touring on his own and recorded his self-titled and "widely praised" debut album of "subtle, folky soul" produced by Norah Jones' bassist, Lee Alexander which included vocals and instrumentation by Norah Jones and members of her band. After it was released, the album peaked at No. 2 on the Billboard Top Heatseekers chart and Lee was named one of Rolling Stone'''s "Top 10 Artists to Watch."(June 10, 2006) Top Heatseekers, Billboard (magazine) One song from the album, called "Colors", appeared on the TV show Grey's Anatomy and in the film Just Like Heaven. Lee's music received additional media attention when he performed on late-night TV shows such as the Late Show with David Letterman and The Tonight Show with Jay Leno.

In 2006, Lee recorded his second album, Supply and Demand, which was produced by a friend of manager Bill Eib, Philadelphia musician and producer Barrie Maguire. An NPR Music reviewer described it as having "more complicated instrumentation and production" than his prior work. The song "Shout Out Loud" was released as a single and peaked at No. 76 on the Billboard 200, and another song, called "Sweet Pea", was used in an AT&T ad campaign.

Lee's third studio album, Last Days at the Lodge was released in 2008 and re-emphasized "his grounding in folk and soul". The album peaked at number 29 on the Billboard 200 chart and Lee performed at the Change Rocks voter registration rally for Barack Obama in Philadelphia that summer opening for Bruce Springsteen.

In 2011, Lee released his fourth album on Blue Note Records, entitled Mission Bell which was produced by Joey Burns of Calexico. The album debuted at number one on the Billboard 200 chart, number one on the Digital Albums chart, number two on the Internet chart, and number one on the Amazon Top-Selling Albums and iTunes charts. The album's single, "Windows are Rolled Down", became a top 10 hit on USA Todays adult-alternative chart. However, the album also has the dubious distinction of being the lowest-selling, number one Billboard album as of 2011 selling only 40,000 copies. Guest artists on the album included Lucinda Williams, Willie Nelson, Priscilla Ahn, Pieta Brown, James Gadson, and Sam Beam.

Lee appeared at Farm Aid 2013  and on the compilation album, The Music Is You: A Tribute to John Denver. He released his fifth studio album, Mountains Of Sorrow, Rivers Of Song in October 2013. Lee concludes his successful US tour in 2022 in New Orleans on Halloween night debuting selections from his "Dreamland" album including his biggest hit in over a decade, "Worry No More".  

Lee’s longtime touring band consists of Jaron Olevksy (piano, keyboards), Zach Djanikian (guitar, mandolin, saxophone, background vocals), Jay White (bass, background vocals), Ryan Hommel (guitar, background vocals), David Streim (keyboards, trumpet) and James Williams (drums). 

Reception
Lee's "folksy, bluesy sound" has been compared to that of John Prine and Norah Jones. His music is said to utilize the "supple funk of his vocals and arid strum of his guitar" while recalling "the low-volume, early-'70s acoustic soul of stars like Bill Withers and Minnie Ripperton". A New York Times music critic described Lee as having a "honeyed singing voice – light amber, mildly sweet, a touch of grain" which he features "squarely, without much fuss or undue strain" in his "1970s folk rock and rustic soul" musical song craft. According to a music writer at ABC News, Lee "has that folksy, bluesy vibe, with a bit of country twang" and a voice that is "ever soulful". Simultaneously Lee has been both lauded and dismissed as the "male Norah Jones" and his lyrics are said to convey "the complexities of everyday emotions" without falling into flowery imagery. Lee's songs have appeared on a number of TV shows including House and Parenthood.

Personal life
Amos Lee describes himself as being of mixed heritage; he admits he is not fully aware of his background. He maintains a residence in West Philadelphia.

He took the stage name "Amos Lee" because he got sick of people mispronouncing his real name.

Discography
Studio albums

Live albums

Extended plays

Singles

Other charted songs

ADid not enter the Hot 100 but charted on Bubbling Under Hot 100 Singles.

DVDsLive From Austin, Texas – (2008) New WestAmos Lee: Live from the Artists Den'' – (2013)

References

External links
Amos Lee's official website
Amos Lee at NPR Music
 

1978 births
21st-century American singers
American folk guitarists
American folk singers
American male singer-songwriters
American rock singers
American rock songwriters
American soul guitarists
American male guitarists
Blue Note Records artists
Dualtone Records artists
Living people
Cherry Hill High School East alumni
People from Cherry Hill, New Jersey
Republic Records artists
Singer-songwriters from Pennsylvania
21st-century American guitarists
Singer-songwriters from New Jersey
Guitarists from Philadelphia
Guitarists from New Jersey
University of South Carolina alumni
21st-century American male singers